Noah Majestic 2022 was a two-night professional wrestling event promoted by CyberFight's sub-brand Pro Wrestling Noah. It took place on April 29 and 30, 2022, in Tokyo, Japan, at the Ryogoku Kokugikan. The event aired on CyberAgent's AbemaTV online linear television service and CyberFight's streaming service Wrestle Universe.

Storylines 
Both of the nights featured a total of twenty-one professional wrestling matches that resulted from scripted storylines, where wrestlers portrayed villains, heroes, or less distinguishable characters in the scripted events that built tension and culminated in a wrestling match or series of matches.

Noah Majestic - N Innovation

Event
The first night event started with the confrontatin between Ikuto Hidaka and Kai Fujimura solded with the victory of the preceding one. Next, Melbourne City Wrestling's Slex picked up a victory over Yasutaka Yano. In the third bout, Kotaro Suzuki and Yuya Susumu fought in a ten-minute time-limit draw. The fourth match portraited the competition between El Texano Jr., Nosawa Rongai and Super Crazy and Hajime Ohara, Tadasuke and Shuji Kondo which ended with the victory of the first team. Next, Hao defeated Nio in singles action. Next, Xtreme Tiger picked up a victory over Seiki Yoshioka. In the seventh match, Dragon Gate's Z-Brats (H.Y.O, SB Kento and Shun Skywalker) defeated Alejandro, Daisuke Harada and Junta Miyawaki. In the eighth match, Ninja Mack defeated Alpha Wolf and Dragon Bane, two of International Wrestling Revolution Group's roster talent sent to an excursion in Japan. In the semi main event, Chris Ridgeway and Yoshinari Ogawa defeated Atsushi Kotoge and Yo-Hey to capture the GHC Junior Heavyweight Tag Team Championship.

In the main event, Hayata defeated Eita to win the GHC Junior Heavyweight Championship for the fourth time in his career.

Results

Noah Majestic

Event
The second show started with the confrontation between Kai Fujimura and Slex and Alejandro and Yasutaka Yano solded with the victory of the preceding team. Next, Kongo (Hajime Ohara, Manabu Soya and Tadasuke) defeated Funky Express (Akitoshi Saito, King Tany and Mohammed Yone) in six-man tag team action. The third bout saw Stinger (Chris Ridgeway, Hayata, Seiki Yoshioka, Yoshinari Ogawa and Yuya Susumu) defeateing Los Perros del Mal de Japón (Eita, El Texano Jr., Kotaro Suzuki, Nosawa Rongai and Super Crazy) by disqualification. In the fourth match, Kazushi Sakuraba and Kendo Kashin picked up a victory over Daiki Inaba and Masato Tanaka. Next, Michael Elgin defeated Masa Kitamiya in singles action. The sixth match saw Masakatsu Funaki securing the third consecutive defense of the GHC National Championship against Simon Gotch. The eighth match portraited Alpha Wolf and Dragon Bane teaming up with Xtreme Tiger and Ninja Mack to defeat Atsushi Kotoge, Daisuke Harada, Junta Miyawaki and Yo-Hey. Next, Naomichi Marufuji and Satoshi Kojima defeated Kinya Okada and Yoshiki Inamura. The semi main event saw Hideki Suzuki and Takashi Sugiura securing their first defense of the GHC Tag Team Championship against Katsuhiko Nakajima and Kenoh.

In the main event, Go Shiozaki succeeded in outmatching Kaito Kiyomiya and winning the GHC Heavyweight Championship for the fifth time in his career, title which was previously vacated by Kazuyuki Fujita who was tested positive for COVID-19.

Results

References

External links
Pro Wrestling Noah official website

Pro Wrestling Noah
CyberAgent
2022 in professional wrestling
December 2022 events in Japan
Professional wrestling in Tokyo
Pro Wrestling Noah shows